This is a list of United Nations Security Council Resolutions 1701 to 1800 adopted between 11 August 2006 and 20 February 2008.

See also 
 Lists of United Nations Security Council resolutions
 List of United Nations Security Council Resolutions 1601 to 1700
 List of United Nations Security Council Resolutions 1801 to 1900

1701